"Beautiful Goal" is a short single by Paul Oakenfold, used in the FIFA video game series and encapsulating the passion and pride of the United Kingdom. Released as a separate soundtrack, subsequently it was licensed to Major League Soccer for use in television advertisements. 2007 became the third year in a row with "Beautiful Goal" being used for the FIFA series. It was completed with a backing riff by Andy Munroe, an amateur guitarist from South Accrington. Oakenfold's previous work includes the Big Brother (UK) theme tune.

Notes

2006 singles
2006 songs
Songs written by Paul Oakenfold
Paul Oakenfold songs